&Audition – The Howling – was a Japanese and South Korean reality competition program that follows the formation and debut of the first boy group under Hybe Labels Japan.

In the live finale on September 3, 2022, the nine members of &Team were revealed. They debuted on December 7, 2022.

Program synopsis 
&Audition – The Howling – A 60-minute, uncut version of the show where 15 trainees move forward together towards their dreams; a documentary-style program where various performances and stories unfold as they aim for debut.

 Hulu Japan (Japan), Hybe Labels Youtube (Global): every Saturday at 1:30PM JST starting on July 9, 2022 (Episodes 1-7)
&Audition – The Howling – Final Round
 Hybe Labels Youtube (Global), Hulu Japan (Japan): 4PM JST live broadcast from Tokyo on September 3, 2022 (Episode 8); two-hour special
 Nippon TV (Japan): 4-5PM JST; one-hour special

&Audition – Live – A shorter 30-minute version of the show, serving as support to the main broadcast, where MCs and an audience watch together with viewers.

 Nippon TV (Japan): 12:59AM every Thursday starting on July 14, 2022

Background 
On January 1, 2021, it was announced that Big Hit Japan would launch the "Big Hit Japan Global Debut Project" to search for artists to debut as a group in Japan and become active worldwide. Former I-Land contestants K, Nicholas, EJ and Taki were to take part as confirmed members of the group, joined by additional trainees determined through an audition program called "&Audition".

On March 19, Big Hit Entertainment re-branded and re-structured into HYBE Corporation, whereby Hybe Labels Japan would now be involved in the program and group's debut. On the same day, an official Twitter account under the name "&AUDITION Boys" was launched for the four confirmed group members. On April 26, 2021, K and EJ made a cameo in the music video for Enhypen's "Drunk-Dazed". On November 4, Hybe Labels Japan shared that the "&Audition" program would begin airing in 2022.

On January 18, 2022, Hybe Labels Japan announced the opening of YouTube channel "&Audition Boys", and various videos and vlogs were uploaded. On March 9, the program was revealed to be titled &Audition – The Howling, and broadcast would start in July 2022 as the first phase of the Global Debut Project. On May 30, the program's official website and social media accounts were opened, as well as the details of its broadcast date. On June 4, themed profile photos of the 15 participating trainees were revealed. The signal song for the program, "The Final Countdown", and its music video were released on June 28.

Producers 
Special Advisor

 Bang Si-hyuk

Mentors

 Pdogg
 Son Sung-deuk

Performance Director

 Sakura Inoue

Producer and Sound Director

 Soma Genda

Special Producers

 Ryosuke Imai
 Scooter Braun
 Zico
Producer information from the official &Audition website.

Special Guests 
 Enhypen (Episodes 1 and 8)
 Tomorrow X Together (Episode 6) 
 Seventeen (Video message; Episodes 3 and 4)
 BTS (Video message; Episode 6)
 RM (Episode 8)

Contestants 
Color key:

Profile 
A total of 15 trainees participated in the show—four confirmed members, who were previously contestants on the South Korean boy group survival reality show I-Land, and 11 new trainees.

Note: Profile information from the official &Audition website, and ages based on the international age system and date of release (June 2022).

Concept 
Each round has a mission involving both an interim check and a performance. The trainees will be judged on vocal ability, performance and a special criteria that will change with each round. Based on evaluations of their performances, the trainees earn a certain number of &BALLs to fill the &RING. Only if they fill the &RING after four rounds can everyone advance to the final round; if they fail to fill the &RING, the planned group's debut may be cancelled.

Episodes

Missions

Round 1: Group signal song mission 
 Episode 1

All trainees perform the theme song "The Final Countdown" together. The special criterion is teamwork.

Minhyung was unable to participate.

Round 2: Concept mission 
 Episodes 2 and 3

K, EJ, Nicholas and Taki all become leaders to four teams and prepare performances with four different concepts. The special criterion is each team's chemistry.

Junwon was unable to participate due to health reasons.

Round 3: Seventeen legendary mission 
 Episodes 4 and 5

The trainees split into three teams and perform songs by Seventeen. They are tasked with creating original choreography, interpreting the songs in their own styles, and contributing to the design of their stage outfits. The special criterion is creativity.

Round 4: BTS mission 

 Episodes 6 and 7

The trainees are divided into two teams. Each team is tasked with performing two BTS songs, one of which is a different arrangement to the original. The fourth round has two evaluations: one centered on vocals, and another solely on performance.

Final Round 

 Episode 8

Junwon performed "Running with the Pack" while seated due to injury.

Final results 
K, Nicholas, EJ and Taki's debut was officially confirmed after Round 4. The remaining five members were decided by a combination of criteria: producer evaluation (40%), special producer evaluation (30%), preliminary global voting (20%), and final live voting (10%).

Result 
The finale was broadcast live on September 3, 2022 from Tokyo. Bang Si-hyuk announced the name of the newly formed boy group to be &Team.

Full Results

Discography

Singles

Related content and spin-offs 

Note: All content was released on the HYBE LABELS+ Youtube channel, unless otherwise stated, while shorter content was re-posted on multiple social media platforms.

Aftermath 
 &TEAM officially debuted on December 7, 2022 with the extended play First Howling: Me.
 On November 21, 2022, &Team released their debut song, "Under the Skin" and released their debut extended play on December 7, 2022.

Some trainees participated in other survival shows:
 Yoo Jun-won to participate in MBC's "Fantasy Boys".
Some trainees opened social media accounts:
Kim Min-hyung opened a personal Instagram account.

References

External links 
&AUDITION - The Howling - Official Website
Hybe Labels Japan Official Website
HYBE LABELS+ Official Youtube Channel

Hybe Corporation
Japanese music television series
Reality competition television series
Hulu Japan